Sugarloaf Mountain is a ski mountain located in Carrabassett Valley, Franklin County, Maine. It is the third highest peak in the state, after Mount Katahdin's Baxter and Hamlin peaks. Sugarloaf is flanked to the south by Spaulding Mountain.

The northeast and west sides of Sugarloaf drain into the South Branch of the Carrabassett River, which flows into the Kennebec River, and into the Gulf of Maine. The southeast side of Sugarloaf drains into Rapid Stream, then into the West Branch of the Carrabassett River.

The Appalachian Trail (AT), a  National Scenic Trail from Georgia to Maine, passes within a mile of the summit, skirting the peak to the west, and the summit is reached by a  side trail. This side trail, and a trail down the east side of Sugarloaf, were originally part of the AT, which has been relocated down the north side of the mountain to the west of the ski slopes. Sugarloaf, a major ski resort is located on the north side of the mountain.

Gallery

See also

List of mountain peaks of North America
List of mountain peaks of the United States
List of mountains in Maine

References

External links
 K2Trav's Guide To Sugarloaf/USA

Mountains of Franklin County, Maine
Sugarloaf
New England Four-thousand footers